The Cats of Copenhagen is a posthumously-published short story written by Irish author James Joyce and illustrated by American artist Casey Sorrow. Written in 1936 for his grandson Stephen James Joyce, it was not published until 2012, when Joyce's work entered the public domain in certain jurisdictions.

Plot
The story describes the city of Copenhagen, Denmark, where "things are not as they seem", and is critical of "fat cats" and other authority figures.

Publication
Ithys Press published their fine arts edition of The Cats of Copenhagen in January 2012. This edition features original pen and ink illustrations by Casey Sorrow, letterpress typeset by Michael Caine, and handmade paper marbling and binding of Christopher Rowlatt.

The publication attracted controversy, as the Zürich James Joyce Foundation's Fritz Senn expressed disappointment that the script of The Cats of Copenhagen had been copied from a letter held at the Foundation without consultation or discussion.

Print editions

References

Short stories by James Joyce
Books published posthumously
2012 books
1936 short stories
Novels set in Copenhagen